Ticklenaked Pond is a lake in Caledonia County, Vermont, in the United States.

"Ticklenaked" is likely a corruption of the Native American (Indian) name. Historian John C. Huden wrote:
It is very doubtful that this hilarious name is of Indian origin; if so, it is possibly a much modified Delaware word meaning "beaver kittens here."

See also
List of lakes in Vermont

References

Lakes of Vermont
Bodies of water of Caledonia County, Vermont